Philip Ruttley (born 1954) is a leading Anglo-Swiss lawyer and published expert in European Union competition (anti-trust) law and international trade law. He has been described as "one of Europe's foremost maritime competition experts".

Biography
Philip Ruttley (b. Philippe Grin) was born in Zürich in 1954 and is descended from the Huguenot Abolitionist Comte Guillaume de Félice and 18th century philosopher Comte Fortunato de Félice. He is also related to Mme de Staël, the 19th century literary figure, and Henri Guisan, the commander of the Swiss armed forces during WWII. He was educated at Harrow School in London, Oxford University (where he was an entrance History scholar, graduating with first class honours in 1976), University of Florence and City University (where he obtained a diploma in Law). He was called to the English Bar in 1980 (Inner Temple) and admitted as a solicitor in 1992. After practising EC law in London and Brussels, he served as a United Nations legal advisor in Rome, and then as an EC Advisor to the UK Government's Treasury Solicitor's Department.

He is currently a partner and Head of the EU and Competition Law Department of the international City firm of Ince & Co. He has appeared in many cases before the European Court of Justice and has been involved in several WTO dispute settlement proceedings.

In 2008, Ruttley acted for the consumer group "Which?" in the first ever European consumer group action against a cartel. A defendant, JJB Sports agreed to pay compensation for its role in price-fixing, as investigated by the UK Government's Office of Fair Trading. The case resulted in fines of up to £17m for the cartel.

He has published widely on EC and World Trade Organization issues. He was secretary and founder of the European Maritime Law Organization, and was also secretary of the World Trade Law Association from 1997 to 2003.

He is married to Hilary Jane Ruttley (née Lewis). They have three children together: 

 Olivia Gabriella Celimène de Félice, Viscountess Yverdon (b. 1987)

 Mathieu Philippe Tancrede de Félice, Viscount Yverdon (b. 1989)
 Marie-Sophie Yolande Laetitia de Félice, Viscountess Yverdon (b. 1994)

Awards
 The Times' Lawyer of the Week 2008

Select bibliography

Books 
 The WTO and International Trade Regulation (Cameron May 1998) Co-author and editor with Iain MacVay and Carol George
 The Impact of the WTO on International Trade (Cameron May 1998) Co-author and editor with Iain MacVay
 Liberalisation and Protectionism in the World Trading System (Cameron May 1999) Co-author and editor with Iain MacVay and Ahmad Masa'deh
 Due Process in WTO Dispute Settlement (Cameron May 2001) Co-author and editor with Iain MacVay and Marc Weisberger

Contributed chapters
 The Idea of Europe: From Antiquity to the European Union (ed Pagden, Cambridge Univ Press, 2002) " The long road to unity: the contribution of law to the process of European integration, 1945–1995"
 The World Trade Organization: Legal, Economic and Political Analysis, (eds Macrory, Appleton and Plummer) Kluwer 2005, chapter on  "The WTO Agreement in European Community Law: status, effect and enforcement" with Marc Weisberger
 Bernstein's Handbook of Arbitration and Dispute Resolution Practice (4th ed), Sweet & Maxwell, [2003] chapter on Dispute Resolution in WTO law
 A Handbook of World Trade: ICC, 2004  chapters on "Anti-dumping regulations and practices" (with particular reference to EU law), 105, "Mechanism for regulating environmental Barriers to Trade within the WTO" (with Marc Weisberger and Fiona Mucklow), "Resolving trade disputes in the WTO" (with Marc Weisberger), "Private party enforcement of WTO law in the EC legal context" (with Marc Weisberger)
 Shawcross & Beaumont:  Air Law (multi-author survey): co-editor with Solange Leandro, of Division X: "Competition/EU" (2012)

Articles
 Classification of Goods under the EEC Common Customs Tariff, New Law Journal, [1985] 181
 International Shipping and EEC Competition Law [1991] European Competition Law Review, 5
 The Consortia Block Exemption  European Transport Law Review [1993], 487
 Les transports multimodaux à l'épreuve des règles communautaires de la concurrence  Le Droit Maritime Français, [1995], 868
 Les accords de consortia: le nouveau régime communautaire, Journal de la Marine Marchande [1995], p. 1857
 Seaports and EC law: a survey of current developments  European Transport Law Review, [1995] 821
 EC Competition Law and Shipping Lloyd's Shipping Economist, 1995
 Aspects juridiques de la concurrence maritime par Garifalia Athanassiou (review article in Le Droit Maritime Français, [1996], 575
 EC Competition Law in Cyberspace: an overview of recent developments, European Competition Law Review [1998] 186
 A new regime for International Financial Services: the WTO Agreement on Financial Services Journal of International Banking Law, [1998] 22
 The direct effect of WTO Agreements in EC Law, International Trade Law Quarterly, [1998], 5
 The WTO Financial Services Agreement Journal of International Financial Markets, [1999] 109
 Liner Conferences: a survey of recent developments in EC competition law, Il Diritto Marittimo [2000 79]
 Law on troubled waters: recent developments in EC maritime competition law, Shipping & Transport Lawyer, [2003] 31
 Stormy Skies Ahead: The New EC Regulation Against Unfair Pricing in the Aviation Sector International Trade Law and Regulation [2005], 33

References

People educated at Harrow School
Living people
University of Florence alumni
Alumni of City, University of London
Alumni of Oriel College, Oxford
1954 births